Ti'julk Mr'asz, codename Gates, is a fictional character, a member of the Legion of Super-Heroes in the DC Universe. Like all natives of the planet Vyrga, Gates has a largely insectoid body. He is also noted for his strong political views, tending towards socialism.

Fictional character biography
Gates was the third non-biped member (after Quislet and Tellus) in the history of the Legion (the first after the 1994 reboot). He was also unique amongst Legionnaires in being their only unwilling member, having been drafted by his planetary government to represent them in the Legion (which he perceived as being militaristic and inherently fascist). Apparently Gates is one of the very few free-thinkers on his homeworld; the rest are unindividualistic conformists.

Gates has played key roles in many missions; his tactics enabled Star Boy to defeat Validus of the Fatal Five and he was able to resist the Emerald Eye's possession. Gates was part of the Legion team that was stranded in the 20th century for a time, where he came up with the strategy to defeat Mantis, and forged a close friendship with teammate Brainiac 5. Gates also joined Ultra Boy in helping out at soup kitchens during their stay.

Like many of the Legionnaires that were original to the Post-Zero Hour continuity, Gates did not appear in the "Threeboot" continuity.

Gates reappeared with his Legion in Final Crisis: Legion of 3 Worlds #2. In the later issues he shows disdain towards the Legion of New Earth for having few non-humanoid members. In #4, he is tasked with bringing the three versions of Brainiac 5 to the Fortress of Solitude, along with Light Lass. In #5, following the villains' defeat, Gates decided to remain with the pre-Crisis Legion.

New 52
In The New 52 timeline, Gates made his first appearance in Legion Lost, where he and several other Legion of Super-Heroes members had become trapped in the 21st century. He was thought killed in the time bubble/transporter accident that stranded the Legionnaires in the past, but in fact survived, though physically damaged. He and his teammates would reunite with their 31st Century comrades and, in another time travel adventure, encounter the present day Justice League United and together battle the cosmic threat Infinitus.

Powers and abilities
Gates has the ability to create glowing green, circular teleportation "gates", which people and objects can travel freely through to emerge from a partner gate at a location he himself defines mentally (it is also possible to make the trip in reverse, travelling from the partner gate to the original gate). Gates' "gates" have been shown to have sharp edges; he accidentally severed Ra's al Ghul's arm once while teleporting.

Equipment
As a member of the Legion of Super-Heroes he is provided a Legion Flight Ring. It allows him to fly and protects him from the vacuum of space and other dangerous environments.

External links
A Hero History Of Gates

References

DC Comics aliens
DC Comics extraterrestrial superheroes
DC Comics superheroes 
DC Comics characters who can teleport 
Characters created by Mark Waid